Visionary art is art that purports to transcend the physical world and portray a wider vision of awareness including spiritual or mystical themes, or is based in such experiences.

History
The Vienna School of Fantastic Realism, first established in 1946, is considered to be an important technical and philosophical catalyst in its strong influence upon contemporary visionary art. Its artists included Ernst Fuchs, Rudolf Hausner, Arik Brauer, Wolfgang Hutter and Anton Lehmden among others. Several artists who would later work in visionary art trained under Fuchs, including Mati Klarwein, Robert Venosa, Philip Rubinov Jacobson and De Es Schwertberger.

Definition

Visionary art often carries themes of spiritual, mystical or inner awareness. Despite this broad definition, there does seem to be emerging some definition to what constitutes the contemporary visionary art 'scene' and which artists can be considered especially influential. Symbolism, Cubism, Surrealism and Psychedelic art are also direct precursors to contemporary visionary art. Notable visionary artists count Hilma af Klint, Hieronymous Bosch, William Blake, Morris Graves (of the Pacific Northwest School of Visionary Art), Emil Bisttram, and Gustave Moreau amongst their antecedents.

Schools and organizations
The Vienna School of Fantastic Realism, which includes Ernst Fuchs and Arik Brauer, is also a strong influence on visionary culture. It may also be considered the European version, with the names being interchangeable.

The Society for the Art of Imagination, founded by Brigid Marlin serves as an important portal for visionary art events. More recently, a new wave of visionary artists collaborate to function as modern cooperatives involved in self-publishing and promotion of visionary artists through the internet and via festivals such as Burning Man and Boom Festival, and exhibition/ritual spaces such as Temple of Visions and the Interdimensional Art Movement.

The American Visionary Art Museum in Baltimore, Maryland, is a museum devoted entirely to visionary art.

Gallery

See also
Burning Man
Fantastic art
Horror vacui
Outsider art
Psychedelic art
Surrealism
Alex Grey
The Symbolist and Decadent art movement
Temples of Humankind
Conceptual art

References

Sources
 Cosmic Art Ramond & Lila Piper (Hawthorne Books) , 1975
 Celestial Visitations The Art of Gilbert Williams (Pomegranate Artbooks) , 1979
 Sacred Mirrors: The Visionary Art of Alex Grey", Carlo McCormick, Inner Traditions International, 1990
 Raw Creation: Outsider Art and Beyond John Maizels,, 1996
 The Art of Adolf Wolfli Elka Spoerri, Daniel Baumann and E. M. Gomez, 2003
 Nothing Is True - Everything Is Permitted: The Life of Brion Gysin John Geiger, (The Disinformation Company), 130. , 2005
 Fantastic Art (Taschen) ( Schurian, Prof. Dr. Walter)  (English edition), 2005
 True Visions (Erik Davis and Pablo Echaurren) (Betty Books) , 2006
 Metamorphosis: 50 Contemporary Surreal, Fantastic and Visionary Artists (beinArt) , 2007

Bibliography
 1975 - Cosmic Art Ramond & Lila Piper (Hawthorne Books) 
 1979 - Celestial Visitations The Art of Gilbert Williams (Pomegranate Artbooks) 
 2005 - Fantastic Art (Taschen) ( Schurian, Prof. Dr. Walter)  (English edition)
 2006 - True Visions (Erik Davis and Pablo Echaurren) (Betty Books) 
 2007 - Metamorphosis (beinArt) 
 2011 - "Positive Creations" (Schiffer Publications) 
 2016 - El Canto de Abraxas'' de Álvaro Robles G. (Editorial Salón Arcano)

External links 

 Collection: "Folk, Self-Taught, Amateur, and Visionary Art" at the University of Michigan Museum of Art

 
Visual arts genres
Modern art
 
Prophecy